Birinci Paşalı (also, Pashaly and Pashaly Pervyye) is a village in the Hajigabul Rayon of Azerbaijan.  The village forms part of the municipality of Şorbaçı.

References 

Populated places in Hajigabul District